The Revista Cubana de Física (Cuban Journal of Physics) is a biannual peer-reviewed open access scientific journal published by the Sociedad Cubana de Física (Cuban Physical Society) and the Physics Faculty (University of Havana) that was established in 1981. It covers all aspects of physics, as well as the history of physics in Latin America and especially in Cuba. Contributions are published either in Spanish or English. In addition to regular issues, occasional special issues contain the proceedings of international events, particularly the general meetings of the Cuban Physical Society. The editor-in-chief is E. Altshuler (University of Havana).

Abstracting and indexing 
The journal is abstracted and indexed in:
Applied Science & Technology Index
Current Physics Index
Emerging Sources Citation Index
Scopus
SPIN bibliographic database

References

External links
 

Physics journals
Biannual journals
Multilingual journals
Publications established in 1981
Academic journals published by learned and professional societies